The Canale Cup is a football (soccer) knockout cup competition for the Brisbane, Australia region that includes teams from the Brisbane Premier League and all Capital Leagues (1–3). From 2017 to 2020 it was known as the Pig 'N' Whistle Canale Cup for sponsorship reasons.

This has been the major knockout cup competition for the Brisbane region since 2002, when it was known as the South-East Queensland Cup, and subsequently the Premier Cup, and since 2010 with the current naming rights sponsor. Before this and on a statewide basis, several knockout competitions have been held since 1894 in various forms, with the major Queensland knockout cup competitions initially called the Charity Cup to 1920, from 1921 to 1958 as the Tristram Shield, between 1959 and 1991 as the Ampol Cup, and between 1992 and 2001 as the Queensland Cup.

From 2014 to 2018, this knockout competition was also linked with various preliminary rounds of the FFA Cup.

Current Cup Competitions 2019-onwards 

The format was changed for 2019, with 35 Capital League clubs entering in the first round, with the 20 winners (15 ties and 5 byes) joining the 12 Brisbane Men's Premier League clubs in the second round (as the Round of 32).

Former Cup Competition format (linked to FFA Cup Qualifiers) 2014–2018

The format for 2014 and 2015 was also a qualifying competition for the FFA Cup, where both the Canale Cup finalists qualified for the FFA Cup Round of 32.

In 2016, the 10 Brisbane-based winners from Round 4 qualified to a separate Canale Cup competition, no longer linked to the FFA Cup qualification process. Apart from the NPL sides, none of the Brisbane-based teams survived beyond Round 7 of that preliminary competition.

For 2017 and 2018, the competition was further restructured, with losing teams from successive rounds of the FFA Cup Preliminary Rounds entering in following rounds of the Canale Cup.

Previous Cup Competitions 2002–2013 (Brisbane-Based) 

References :

Queensland Cup 1992–2001 

References :

Ampol Cup 1959–1991 

References :

Tristram Shield 1921–1961 

References :

Charity Cup 1894–1920 

References :

See also

 History of association football in Brisbane, Queensland
 Honours list for Brisbane Premier League (and predecessor competitions)
 FFA Cup

Notes

References

Soccer in Brisbane
Soccer cup competitions in Australia